The Fuller House, at 220 W. Union in Minden in Webster Parish, Louisiana, is a Queen Anne-style house which was built in about 1905.  It was listed on the National Register of Historic Places in 1996.  It has also been known as the Fuller-White House.

While Queen Anne houses of its era would often have Eastlake detailing, this house is unusual for having ornament which is almost all Colonial Revival in style.  These elements include a Palladian window, the simple Tuscan columns on the house's wraparound gallery, and denticular molding under the eaves of the main block and on the turret and dormer.

It was deemed "locally significant as a superior example of the Queen Anne Revival style within the context of the several parish region of North Louisiana. It achieves this distinction because of its complex massing, culminating in a turret. The house is also important for its well-detailed and well-preserved interiors."

References

Houses on the National Register of Historic Places in Louisiana
Queen Anne architecture in Louisiana
Colonial Revival architecture in Louisiana
Houses completed in 1905
Webster Parish, Louisiana
1905 establishments in Louisiana